Julodella is a genus of beetles in the family Buprestidae, containing the following species:

 Julodella abeillei (Théry, 1893)
 Julodella abyssinica (Théry, 1928)
 Julodella bicolor (Obst, 1906)
 Julodella brevilata (Semenov, 1893)
 Julodella cicatricosa (Germar, 1824)
 Julodella cymbiformis Bílý, 1990
 Julodella dilaticollis (Semenov, 1893)
 Julodella fairmairei (Théry, 1895)
 Julodella globithorax (Steven, 1830)
 Julodella haarlovi Descarpentries, 1965
 Julodella impluviata (Semenov, 1893)
 Julodella impressithorax Bílý, 1983
 Julodella iranica Bílý, 1983
 Julodella kaufmanni (Ballion, 1871)
 Julodella mesopotamica (Holdhaus, 1920)
 Julodella parvula Bílý, 1983
 Julodella plasoni Marseul, 1889
 Julodella schochi (Théry, 1896)
 Julodella shestoperovi Stepanov, 1959
 Julodella testaceipes Obenberger, 1928
 Julodella zarudniana Semenov, 1903

References

Buprestidae genera